The Scapegoat is a 2013 French comedy film directed by Nicolas Bary.

Plot summary
As attention-grabbing and controversial incidents take place wherever Benjamin Malaussene goes, the cops and his colleagues suspect him. He is then determined to find out who is harassing him.

Cast 
 Raphaël Personnaz as Benjamin Malaussène
 Bérénice Bejo as Aunt Julia
 Guillaume de Tonquédec as Sainclair 
 Emir Kusturica as Stojil
 Thierry Neuvic as Inspector Carrega
 Mélanie Bernier as Louna
 Alice Pol as The child psychiatrist
 Youssef Hajdi as Amar
 Marie-Christine Adam as Miss Hamilton
 Isabelle de Hertogh as The dissatisfied customer

References

External links 
 
 

2013 comedy films
2013 films
French comedy films
2010s French-language films
2010s French films